Hoseyn Ghalayem (also Romanized as Ḩoseyn Ghalayem; also known as Beyt-e Alvān) is a village in Seyyed Abbas Rural District, Shavur District, Shush County, Khuzestan Province, Iran. At the 2006 census, its population was 657, in 104 families.

References 

Populated places in Shush County